Douglas Howard may refer to:

 Douglas Sheffield, Baroness Sheffield (1542/43–1608), née Howard, English noblewoman
 Douglas Howard (diplomat) (1897–1987), British diplomat
 Douglas Legate Howard (1885–1936), American naval officer and coach of the United States Naval Academy football team